Štajngrob (in older sources also Steingrab) is a small settlement west of Šentjanž in the Municipality of Sevnica in east-central Slovenia. The area is part of the historical region of Lower Carniola. The municipality is now included in the Lower Sava Statistical Region.

References

External links
Štajngrob at Geopedia

Populated places in the Municipality of Sevnica